Riverside Drive may refer to:

Riverside Drive (Lake Elsinore, California)
Riverside Drive (Los Angeles)
Riverside Drive (Manhattan)
Riverside Drive Historic District, Covington, Kentucky
Riverside Drive (London, Ontario)
Riverside Drive (Ottawa)
Riverside Drive (Windsor, Ontario)
Riverside Drive, Perth, Western Australia